A destructive severe weather and tornado outbreak struck the Central Plains, Great Lakes, Southeastern United States over a four day period. Multiple strong tornadoes were confirmed as well as widespread severe hail and wind, lightning, and heavy rain. One violent F4 tornado, which may have reached F5 intensity, caused severe damage between Lawrence and Kansas City, Kansas, injuring three people. Although the tornadoes themselves only caused eight injuries, scores of fatalities and additional injuries came from the non-tornadic effects as well.

Meteorological synopsis
Two low-pressure systems formed over the Central Plains; the first one formed over Southeast Colorado on May 21 and moved eastward before moving northeastward in front of a second, slower moving low-pressure center that formed over south central South Dakota and moved into northeastern Nebraska. Both these lows moved eastward before the first one dissipated over Eastern Iowa while the other followed generally the same path as its predecessor. It moved through the Great Lakes region through May 25, before acceleration northeastward into Ontario, Canada. In the meantime, the complex setup led to a large area of severe thunderstorms, some of which became tornadic.

Confirmed tornadoes

May 21 event
The CDNS listed an additional tornado:
A tornado occurred in Arvada, Colorado. The condensation funnel did not reach the ground and damage was light. Some birds were killed when they were drawn into the funnel.

May 22 event

May 23 event

May 24 event

Non-tornadic impacts

March 21
Severe hail, lightning, damaging winds, heavy rain affected parts of Kansas and Oklahoma on March 21. In Sedgwick County, Kansas, a church was struck by lightning, tearing a hole into it. A house was also struck by lightning, damaging the roof and injuring two people who were sleeping. Northwest of Harmon, Oklahoma a farmer driving a tractor was struck by lightning and killed.

March 22
 hail caused spotted damage to wheat crops in the south central Marshall County, Kansas with individual losses amounting to 60 to 75 percent of crops with more extensive damage to wheat crops in Frankfort and Bigelow. Another hailstorm caused damage in Pawnee County, Nebraska while irregular shaped hail up to tennis ball size caused major damage in Caney, Kansas. Hail caused severe damage to 51 roofs in Cleveland and Pawnee Counties in Oklahoma with scattered damage to wheat in Tillman County, especially near Grandfield. There was wind damage to multiple buildings and lightning burned down a barn. Six picnickers in Kansas City were injured when the tree they were huddling under was struck by lightning, with one of them being hospitalized for severe burns.

March 23
A large area of severe weather struck an area from Texas to the west, Michigan to the north, Louisiana to the south and Mississippi to the east. A swath of damaging winds struck an area from near Okarche to Cashion, Oklahoma. About 100,000 acres of wheat and other small cropland were affected by these winds. Severe hail also occurred between Okarche and Seward. Total hail loss to crops, including near ripe wheat, was estimated at $2 million. Almost every structure in Okarche had hail damage to their roofs, with total damage estimated at $25,000. A woman in Cashion was also injured by flying glass. In Oklahoma City, a house was struck by lightning with two occupants be injured when it caught fire. Another house suffered minor damage when it was also struck by lightning. Another home was engulfed in flames in Tahlequah when it was struck by lightning, resulting in the deaths of nine children as well as three other injuries. Strong straight-line winds damaged an industrial plant on the north side of Magnolia, Arkansas, injuring one person. A lightning fatality also occurred in Jackson, Mississippi when a child was struck and killed while riding a bicycle.

March 24
Lightning from the previous day's storms struck a radio shop in Selina, Kansas, starting a fire which resulted in $330 in damage to the building as well as $1,000 in damage to its contents. The only other severe weather reported on this day occurred near Palmyra, Missouri, where hail destroyed crops and damaged roofs, windows, and vehicles. The same storm also produced lightning that killed three cows and destroyed a farm outbuilding while damaging another one.

See also
 List of North American tornadoes and tornado outbreaks
 List of F4 and EF4 tornadoes
 List of F5 and EF5 tornadoes

Notes

References

Tornadoes of 1952
F4 tornadoes
1952 in Kansas
Tornadoes in Kansas
1952 in Missouri
Tornadoes in Missouri
1952 in Oklahoma
Tornadoes in Oklahoma
1952 in Texas
Tornadoes in Texas
1952 in Iowa
Tornadoes in Iowa
1952 in Florida
Tornadoes in Florida
Tornadoes in Ohio
1952 in Ohio
Tornadoes in Illinois
1952 in Illinois